Domenico Pace (9 July 1924 – 16 August 2022) was an Italian fencer. He competed in the team sabre event at the 1956 Summer Olympics.

References

External links

1924 births
2022 deaths
Italian male fencers
Olympic fencers of Italy
Fencers at the 1956 Summer Olympics